Elections to Lancaster City Council took place on 3 May 2003.  The whole council was up for election and it remained in No Overall Control.

Following the election, the composition of the council was as follows:

Election result

|- style="background-color:#F6F6F6"
| colspan="7" style="text-align: right; margin-right: 0.5em" | Turnout
| style="text-align: right; margin-right: 0.5em" | 36
| style="text-align: right; margin-right: 0.5em" | 36,220
| style="text-align: right; margin-right: 0.5em" | 
|-

Ward results

Bare

Bolton-Le-Sands

Bulk

Carnforth

Castle

Duke's

Ellel

Halton-with-Aughton

Harbour

Heysham Central

Heysham North

Heysham South

John O'Gaunt

Kellet

Lower Lune Valley

Overton

Poulton

Scotforth East

Scotforth West

Silverdale

Skerton East

Skerton West

Slyne-with-Hest

Torrisholme

University

Upper Lune Valley

Warton

Westgate

References

Lancaster
2003
2000s in Lancashire